Fabryka Zirok ( – Star Factory), is a Ukrainian televised talent show, which began in 2007 that features a group of young male and female candidates, aged 16 or older, across the country.

The show became a huge success and a must-watch event for its fans. It is the Ukrainian adaptation of the French television show Star Academy, which is produced by Endemol. Fabryka Zirok is produced by Dutch company Endemol and Ukrainian Novyi Kanal. The show is based on the Spanish format called Operación Triunfo.

The show basically revolves over 16 contestants that go live in an isolated penthouse apartment, with one of the contestants getting eliminated every week. The contestants get to showcase their talents in a weekly concert in which the contestants get to perform on stage with various designs, dancers, solo performances, a cappella on piano and sharing the stage with the most popular singers in Ukraine and the CIS. The contestants were required to be aged 16 or older at the time of the contest.

Teachers
 Vocals: Olena Grebenyok
 Choreography: Olena Kolyadenko
 Acting Instructor: Roman Viktyok
 Fitness: Lilya Podkopayeva
 Stylist: Angela Litsiya, Volodimir Tarasyok
 Psychiatrist: Vadim Kolesnikov

Series overview

Seasons & Contestants

Fabryka Zirok 1 (2007-2008) 
 Olga Tsibulska   Winner
 Katya Velaskes
 Sasha Ilchyshyn
 Vitaliy Yarouviy
 Elizabeth Anum-Dorkhuso
 Christina Kim
 Jeka Milkovskiy
 Yulia Borza
 Vitaliy Bondarenko
 Dasha Astafieva
 Arina Domsky
 Taras Chernyenko
 Dima Kadnay
 Evgen Tolochniy
 Oleksander Bodyanckiy
 Dasha Kolomiets

Fabryka Zirok 2 (2008)
 Duet Vladimir Dantes - Vadim Oleynik   Winner
 Anastasia Vostokova
 Kira Shaytanova
 Regina Todorenko
 Alisa Tarabarova
 Mark Savin
 Ganna Mukhina
 Lina Mytsuky
 Olena Vinogradova
 Boris Aprel
 Kara Kay
 Denis Dekanin
 Vlad Darvin
 Max Barskih
 Gurgen

Fabryka Zirok 3 (2009)

 Stas Shurins   Winner
 Andrey Philipov
 Mykola Serga
 Oleksiy Matias
 Eva Bushmina
 Vitaliy Cherva
 Anastasia Plis
 Vasil Nagirnyak
 Tatiana Vorjeva
 Artyem Mekh
 Irina Kristinina
 Erika
 Santa Dimopulos
 Borisenko Brothers
 Alina Actrovska
 Sabrina

Fabryka Superfinal (2010)

Selected contestants from the past 3 seasons compete to become the top superstar:
 Oleksiy Matias   Winner
 Maxim Barskikh
 Olga Tsibulska
 Mykola Serga
 Vitaliy Bondarenko
 Vadim Oleynik
 Stas Shurins
 Vladimir Dantes
 Elizabeth Anum-Dorkhuso
 Eva Bushmina
 Boris Aprel
 Borisenko Brothers
 Dima Kadnay
 Erika
 Regina
 Alisa Trabarova

Fabryka Zirok 4 (2011)
Producer
 Sergei Kuzin

Jury
 Masha Efrosinina
 Iryna Bilyk
 Alyona Mozgovaya
 Vitaliy Drozdov

Contestants
 Anna Voloshina
 Pavel Voronets
 Snezhana Firsova
 Sonya
 Denis Lyubimov
 Anton Klimik
 Misha Sokolovskiy
 Paulina
 Sergey Klimentyev
 Kseniya Lanova
 Dasha Doris
 Yuriy Klyuchnik
 Yulia Rudnyeva   Winner
 Yevgeniy Belozerov
 Masha Goya
 Dima Kaminskiy

Notes

External links
Fabryka Zirok 1
Fabryka Zirok 2
Fabryka Zirok 3
Fabrika Superfinal
Fabryka Zirok 4
Novyi Kanal Official site

Star Academy
Ukrainian reality television series
Novyi Kanal original programming